Chef Thémis, cuisinier sans frontières is a Canadian 2009 documentary film.

Synopsis 
Chef Thémis, the founder of the Cooks Without Borders organization, returns to his country of origin, Madagascar, to teach classes and show the underprivileged how to cook. With very few means, he manages to put together his first class, comprising eighteen people. From his enthusiasm as he starts out to his doubts when faced with the gigantic task that lies ahead of him, the film accompanies him over the three years the project lasts. Beyond their adventure, the film asks a question that any emigrant may face. Querying exile and the need to repay a moral debt to the country they left behind.

Awards 
 Rencontres Cinématographiques de Québec 2010

References 
 (source for synopsis)

2009 films
Canadian documentary films
2009 documentary films
Films about chefs
Documentary films about food and drink
Films set in Madagascar
Food and drink in Madagascar
2000s Canadian films